Below are player transfers for the 2015 Indonesia Super League and 2015 Liga Indonesia Premier Division.

Starting with the 2015 season, PT Liga applied a restriction for Indonesia Super League clubs to use maximum three foreign players and no foreign players for Liga Indonesia Premier Division clubs.

Winter transfers

Summer transfers

References

Indonesian
transfers
Indonesia
Lists of Indonesian football transfers